Granny's Dancing on the Table is a 2015 Swedish drama film directed by Hanna Sköld. It was screened in the Contemporary World Cinema section of the 2015 Toronto International Film Festival.

Cast
 Blanca Engström as Eini
 Lennart Jähkel as The Father
 Karin Bertling as Granny

References

External links
 

2015 films
2015 drama films
Swedish drama films
2010s Swedish-language films
2010s Swedish films